Michael Lee "Mickey" Weston (born March 26, 1961) is an American former Major League Baseball pitcher for the Baltimore Orioles, New York Mets, Philadelphia Phillies, and Toronto Blue Jays. He pitched for five years in the major leagues and currently ministers to youth through baseball at UPI. Weston serves as team chaplain for the Chicago White Sox through Baseball Chapel.

On June 18, 1989, Weston picked up his only career major league save. It came against the Oakland Athletics. Weston pitched three shutout innings to close out a 4-2 Orioles victory, saving the game for starter Dave Schmidt. He spent most of the 1990 season with the Rochester Red Wings where he had an 11–1 record with a 1.98 ERA but was  innings short of qualifying for the ERA title. He was traded from the Orioles to the Blue Jays for Paul Kilgus on December 14, 1990.

A native of Flint, Michigan, Weston attended Eastern Michigan University. In 1981, he played collegiate summer baseball with the Chatham A's of the Cape Cod Baseball League. He was selected by the Mets in the 12th round of the 1982 MLB Draft.

References

External links

 https://web.archive.org/web/20070318131846/http://www.upi.org/staff/players/mickeyweston.html

1961 births
Living people
American expatriate baseball players in Canada
Major League Baseball pitchers
Baltimore Orioles players
New York Mets players
Philadelphia Phillies players
Toronto Blue Jays players
Rochester Red Wings players
Tidewater Tides players
Columbia Mets players
Norfolk Tides players
Syracuse Chiefs players
Colorado Springs Sky Sox players
Toledo Mud Hens players
Little Falls Mets players
Charlotte Knights players
New Haven Ravens players
Scranton/Wilkes-Barre Red Barons players
Lynchburg Mets players
Eastern Michigan Eagles baseball players
Chatham Anglers players
Baseball players from Flint, Michigan